Kurkanlu-ye Olya (also Romanized as Kūrkānlū-ye ‘Olyā; also known as Kūrkānlū-ye Bālā, Kūr Kānlū, and Kūkānlū) is a village in Jirestan Rural District, Sarhad District, Shirvan County, North Khorasan Province, Iran. At the 2006 census, its population was 138, in 33 families.

References 

Populated places in Shirvan County